The Fichtelnaab is a river in Upper Franconia and the Upper Palatinate, Bavaria, Germany. It rises in the Fichtelgebirge and flows into the Waldnaab near Windischeschenbach.

Course 

The source of the Fichtelnaab is located on the southeastern slope of the Ochsenkopf northwest of Fichtelberg and west of the Fichtelsee (10.5 hectares and 752 m above NN). From there it flows southeast through the villages of Fichtelberg and Mehlmeisel in the district of Tirschenreuth. From there the Fichtelnaab passes through Brand, Ebnath, Neusorg and Erbendorf to Windischeschenbach, where it joins the Waldnaab.

Tributaries 

 Moosbach (right)
 Kratzebach (left)
 Fallbach (right)
 Geisbach (right)
 Fuhrbach (left)
 Saugrabenbach (right)
 Gregnitz (left)
 Goldbach (right)
 Witzelbach (right)
 Höllbach (left)
 Felberger Bach (right)
 Forellenbach (left)
 Tiefenbach (right)
 Galgenbach (right)
 Steinbach (right)
 Heinbach (left)

Sources 
 Die Naab – mit Waldnaab, Fichtelnaab, Haidenaab. 144 Seiten, Pustet, Regensburg,.

References

Rivers of Bavaria
Fichtel Mountains
Rivers of Germany